Cymindis rubriceps is a species of ground beetle in the subfamily Harpalinae. It was described by Andrewes in 1934.

References

rubriceps
Beetles described in 1934